Nicola Jane Bryant (born 11 October 1960) is an English actress known for her roles as Peri Brown, a companion to both the Fifth and Sixth Doctors in the BBC science fiction television series Doctor Who, from 1984 to 1986 and as Martine Johnson the dance teacher in the school drama series The Biz from 1995 to 1997. She also played Miss Brown in The Stranger film series and Lana in Star Trek Continues.

Early life
Nicola Bryant was born and raised in a small village near Guildford in Surrey, the older of two daughters of Denis and Sheila Bryant. She has a younger sister named Tracy. She began taking dance classes at the age of three, and also took piano lessons. At the age of ten she auditioned to go to ballet schools, but was unable to take up places offered because of asthma. Upset by this development, she joined a local amateur dramatic group.

On leaving school she auditioned for all of the London drama schools, and took up a scholarship to the Webber Douglas Academy of Dramatic Art. In her final year there, she played the part of Nanette in a production of the musical No, No, Nanette.

Career
Bryant's first professional part was as Peri Brown in Doctor Who. She played the part from 1984 to 1986, first with Peter Davison, and then with Colin Baker as the Doctor. Bryant's tenure on the show was met with raised eyebrows in some quarters as series producer John Nathan-Turner admitted (in his book Doctor Who: The Companions and elsewhere) that his intention was to pump up the sex appeal of the ageing series by casting the young actress who was often seen wearing low-cut outfits in the show. Her character was American and for a while a publicity-driven fiction was maintained suggesting Bryant was also American, something Bryant had herself stated in press interviews when she landed the part. During her final series on Doctor Who, the actress was allowed to dress more conservatively on the show.

Bryant appeared in the Doctor Who serial The Two Doctors (1985), and she enjoyed working with Patrick Troughton, who returned as the Second Doctor. During the programme's hiatus during 1985 and 1986, Bryant reprised the role of Peri in a BBC radio production entitled Slipback alongside Baker.

After appearing in Doctor Who, Bryant spent nine months at the Savoy Theatre in the West End of London in the thriller Killing Jessica with Patrick Macnee, directed by Bryan Forbes. She was cast in other television roles, including a part in Blackadder's Christmas Carol (1988). In the early to mid-1990s, she co-starred with Baker in a series of made-for-video science fiction films entitled The Stranger for BBV, although the first few films in the series were little more than Doctor Who episodes in disguise. She also appeared alongside Baker, Davison, Sylvester McCoy and Jon Pertwee in another BBV production, The Airzone Solution, which includes a love scene between Baker and Bryant.

Bryant has reprised the role of Peri in several of the Big Finish Productions Doctor Who spin-off audio plays, appearing both with Peter Davison and Colin Baker. She also directed UNIT: The Wasting and Judge Dredd: 99 Code Red!.

In February 2006, she performed in a New End Theatre production of the Carl Djerassi play Taboos, and in early 2007 appeared in a London stage production of Tom Stoppard's Rock 'n' Roll at the Duke of York's Theatre. A DVD documentary, In The Footsteps of The Two Doctors, following Bryant's return to some of the locations featured in the Doctor Who serial The Two Doctors, was released in late 2006.

She returned to the stage in 2008 in a touring production of an adaptation of Daphne du Maurier's "Don't Look Now", playing the part of Laura Baxter.  This production continued into 2009.

In the summer of 2009, Bryant filmed an improvised documentary-style film for Australian director Ben Briand as well as recording eight audio stories for Big Finish as a "missing season" of adventures for Doctor Who. On 2 March 2010 she appeared in Holby City as a television news reporter, and in 2011 she featured in the Dark Shadows audio drama The Blind Painter. In 2013 she appeared in a Doctor Who-themed episode of the game show Pointless.

Bryant guest-starred as 'Lana' in the 2017 two-part finale of the internet series Star Trek Continues, which finishes the five-year mission of Star Trek: The Original Series.

Appearing in many award-winning commercials, Bryant has been the face of Woolwich Building Society, National Saving, and Nurofen. Bryant was in the Ridley Scott Associates production for Axa Health Insurance.

Bryant's voice-over work spans more than three decades. She has been the voice behind BMW, Duchy Originals, Florida Orange Juice, Twinings Tea, Nationwide, Woolwich Building Society, numerous medical and pharmaceutical companies and Bovis Houses She has also voiced documentaries for the BBC and NBC.

Filmography

Film

Television

Audio

Theatre

References

External links
 
 Official website
 Nicola Bryant at shillpages.com/dw (Doctor Who Image Archive)
 
 

1960 births
20th-century English actresses
21st-century English actresses
Living people
Actresses from Surrey
Alumni of the Webber Douglas Academy of Dramatic Art
English film actresses
English radio actresses
English stage actresses
English television actresses
Actors from Guildford